The International Criminal Court investigation in Libya or the Situation in Libya is an investigation started in March 2011 by the International Criminal Court (ICC) into war crimes and crimes against humanity claimed to have occurred in Libya since 15 February 2011. The initial context of the investigation was the 2011 Libyan Civil War and the time frame of the investigation continued to include the 2019 Western Libya offensive.

Initiation 
The ICC investigation in Libya was initiated by the February 2011 United Nations Security Council Resolution 1970 in the context of the 2011 Libyan Civil War. The pre-trial chamber judges are Péter Kovács (presiding), Marc Perrin de Brichambaut and Reine Alapini-Gansou.

First Libyan Civil War
Investigations started during the First Libyan Civil War, in 2011, led to several arrest warrants.

Arrest warrants
On 27 June 2011, the ICC issued warrants of arrest for the Libyan head of state, Muammar Gaddafi, for his second son, Saif al-Islam Gaddafi, and for Abdullah Senussi, Muammar Gaddafi's intelligence chief and brother-in-law, married to Muammar Gaddafi's sister-in-law, for murders and persecution of unarmed civilians as crimes against humanity under Articles 7(1)(a) and 7(1)(h) of the Rome Statute. The case against Muammar Gaddafi was closed by the ICC shortly after his death.

, the ICC had outstanding warrants for the arrest of Tohami Khaled, former head of the Internal Security Agency of Libya during the final years of the Muammar Gaddafi government; and of Saif al-Islam Gaddafi, both of whom were believed by the ICC to remain at large. Saif al-Islam Gaddafi had been captured in Zintan in 2014 and rumoured to have been released in June 2018.

Second Libyan Civil War
Investigations by the ICC continued during the Second Libyan Civil War, which started in 2014.

In April 2019, during the 2019 Western Libya offensive, ICC Chief Prosecutor Fatou Bensouda stated that both those directly committing war crimes in Libya during the conflict and their commanders would be liable to prosecution by the ICC, including anyone "ordering, requesting, encouraging or contributing in any other manner to the commission of crimes within the jurisdiction of the Court". Prime Minister Fayez al-Sarraj of the Tripoli-based Government of National Accord (GNA) stated on 17 April that the GNA would provide documentation to the ICC regarding the 16 April Grad shelling of residential areas that killed at least seven people and wounded 17, for which he attributed responsibility to Khalifa Haftar, leader of the Tobruk-based Libyan National Army (LNA). On 2 May, a spokesperson for the GNA, Muhanad Younis, stated that administrative responsibility had been allocated for documenting war crimes during the Western Libya offensive and providing the documentation to the ICC.

Arrest warrants 
, the ICC had two outstanding warrants for the arrest of LNA commander Mahmoud al-Werfalli, for involvement in seven alleged executions in and near Benghazi of 33 people during June 2016 to July 2017 and for allegedly executing ten people "in front of a cheering crowd" in Benghazi between 23 and 25 January 2018. , the LNA had claimed that al-Werfalli had been arrested and was being investigated by military authorities, while the ICC believed that he was not under arrest and was commanding the al-Saiqa brigade of the LNA. In February 2018, information about al-Werfalli's arrest status was unclear, and an Interpol red notice for his arrest was issued. On 15 June 2022, the ICC dropped its case against al-Werfalli, more than a year after he was killed in Benghazi.

External links
 ICC website: Situation in Libya; case number: ICC-01/11

References 

Libya
War crimes in Libya